= Miemsie Retief =

South African actress and painter

Miemsie Heckroodt
- Born: Miemsie Retief; South Africa
- Education: Hugo Naude Art Centre, UNISA
- Occupation: Actress
- Years active: 1959–1969
- Spouse: Fil Heckroodt

Miemsie Retief is a South African actress and painter. She started her career as a model and made her acting debut in Nooi van my hart, Afrikaans for 'Girl of my heart'. She was regarded as the South African Marilyn Monroe, because of her blonde hair and beautiful body.

Retief is married to Fil Heckroodt, a previous director of law at SABC. They currently live in Aucklandpark, Johannesburg.

== Filmography ==
- Nooi van my hart, 1959
- Piet se tante, 1959
- Oupa en die Plaasnooientjie, 1960
- Jy's Lieflik Vananaad, 1962
- Petticoat Safari, 1969
